Zarównie  is a village in the administrative district of Gmina Padew Narodowa, within Mielec County, Subcarpathian Voivodeship, in south-eastern Poland.

The village consists of 115 houses, 1 small grocery shop and 1 Christian Church, the village measures 2km long and 3.3km wide with the area being 6.94 square kilometres

References

Villages in Mielec County